Henleys was a men's  and womenswear brand based in Manchester, United Kingdom.

Company history

Henleys was established in 1996 by Ben Luscombe, and Simon Peters became a partner in 2000. It is a private limited company (Henleys Clothing Limited). Starting out as a men's shirt brand, the Henleys range branched out into casual wear in the late 1990s, followed by a ladies' range in 2002.

Henleys was placed 76th in the Sunday Times Fast Track Top 100 companies in 2009, with an annual sales growth of 63%.

Henley's went into Administration in 2011.

Products 
 Shoes
 Tracksuit Bottoms
 Jeans
 Men's Shirts
 T-shirts

References

External links
 Henleys
 Henleys Australia

Clothing brands of the United Kingdom
Companies that have entered administration in the United Kingdom